Olivia Hussey (born Olivia Osuna; 17 April 1951) is an English film, stage, and television actress. Her awards include a Golden Globe Award and a David di Donatello Award. The daughter of Argentine opera singer Andrés Osuna, Hussey was born in Buenos Aires and spent most of her early life in her mother's native England. She aspired to become an actress at a young age and studied drama for five years at Italia Conti Academy of Theatre Arts in London.

Hussey began acting professionally as an adolescent. She appeared in a 1966 London production of The Prime of Miss Jean Brodie, opposite Vanessa Redgrave; this led to her being scouted for the role of Juliet in Franco Zeffirelli's 1968 film adaptation of Romeo and Juliet. Hussey received widespread acclaim and international recognition for her performance.

In 1974, she appeared as the lead character Jess Bradford in the cult slasher film Black Christmas. This and subsequent horror films earned her the label of scream queen. She reunited with Zeffirelli in the miniseries Jesus of Nazareth (1977) as Mary and appeared in John Guillermin's Agatha Christie adaptation Death on the Nile (1978). She appeared in several international productions throughout the 1980s, including the Japanese production Virus (1980) and the Australian dystopian action film Turkey Shoot (1982). She appeared in two made-for-television horror productions: Psycho IV: The Beginning and Stephen King's It, both first screened in 1990.

In addition to screen acting, Hussey has worked as a voice actress, providing voice roles in Star Wars video games including Star Wars: Rogue Squadron, Star Wars: Force Commander, and Star Wars: The Old Republic.

Early life
Hussey was born Olivia Osuna on 17 April 1951 in Buenos Aires, Argentina, the first child of Argentine opera singer Andrés Osuna (who performed under the stage name Osvaldo Ribó), and Joy (née Hussey), a legal secretary originally from England. Her parents were both Roman Catholics, and she was raised in that denomination. "My mother was a devout Catholic," Hussey recalled. "I grew up with a mini-altar at home that she had; a candle was always alight on it. She always had a great love for God, and she instilled that in me." When Hussey was two years old, her parents separated but never divorced.

Hussey was fascinated by acting from a young age, and as a child, would dress herself and pretend to be a nun. At the age of seven, she moved with her mother and younger brother to London, where she spent the remainder of her early life. There, Hussey auditioned and was enrolled into the Italia Conti Academy drama school, Hussey negotiated reduced school fees by showing her passion for acting. She attended for five years. At 13, she began acting professionally on stage.

Career

1968–1969: Career beginnings and Romeo and Juliet
Assuming her mother's maiden name as her stage name, Hussey appeared on the London stage in a West End production of The Prime of Miss Jean Brodie, playing the role of Jenny opposite Vanessa Redgrave. During the run of this play, Italian film director Franco Zeffirelli noticed her because "she was the only choice mature enough with experience and natural beauty to play Juliet while still looking 14." In 1964, Hussey appeared in an episode of the television series Drama. The following year, she appeared in minor roles in two films: The Battle of the Villa Fiorita and Cup Fever.

At 15, Hussey was chosen out of 500 actresses to star as Juliet in Zeffirelli's film version of Romeo and Juliet (1968), opposite 16-year-old Leonard Whiting's Romeo. Her performance won her a special David di Donatello Award and the Golden Globe Award for New Star of the Year - Actress in 1969.

In a August 2018 interview with Stephanie Nolasco for Fox News to promote the release of her autobiography Girl on the Balcony, Hussey discussed how she felt at ease on the set when filming the nude scene: "We shot it at the end of the film. So by that time...we've become one big family. It wasn't that big of a deal. And Leonard wasn't shy at all! In the middle of shooting I just completely forgot I didn't have clothes on."

In another 2018 interview with Variety, Hussey defended the nude scene, saying, "Nobody my age had done that before," she said, adding that Zeffirelli shot it tastefully. "It was needed for the film. Everyone thinks they were so young they didn't realize what they were doing. But we were very aware. We both came from drama schools and when you work you take your work very seriously."

After the success of Romeo and Juliet, Hollywood producer Hal B. Wallis offered her the title role in Anne of the Thousand Days (1969) and the co-starring role with John Wayne in True Grit (1969). In her 2018 memoir Hussey stated that she had "mumbled something about being interested in "Anne of the Thousand Days" but added that she "couldn't see herself with Wayne". She stated that this "adolescent and opinionated" remark inevitably ended her professional relationship with Wallis, and he immediately withdrew his offer from her, explaining, "It had taken me less than a minute to talk my way out of it".

1970–2000: Black Christmas and continued acting

In 1971, she appeared in the British drama All the Right Noises, followed by the crime film The Summertime Killer (1972), and the musical Lost Horizon (1973), opposite Liv Ullmann, John Gielgud, and Sally Kellerman. In 1974, she played the leading role of Jess Bradford in the Canadian horror film Black Christmas (1974), which became influential as a forerunner of the slasher film genre of horror films. She played Mary, the mother of Jesus, in the 1977 television production of Jesus of Nazareth (her second work for director Zeffirelli). In 1978, she played Rosalie Otterbourne in Death on the Nile with Peter Ustinov, and appeared in The Cat and the Canary (1979). She also starred as Marit in the Japanese film Virus (1980), and played Rebecca of York in the 1982 remake of Ivanhoe (1982); the same year, she had a lead role in the Australian horror film Turkey Shoot (1982).

In 1987, Hussey appeared in a clip for the Michael Jackson video Liberian Girl, among others, who also included Steven Spielberg, John Travolta, Olivia Newton-John, Whoopi Goldberg, Lou Ferrigno, and Billy Dee Williams. In 1990, Hussey appeared in two horror projects, playing Norma Bates, the mother of Norman Bates, in Psycho IV: The Beginning, a prequel to Alfred Hitchcock's Psycho (1960), and in the miniseries It, an adaptation of the Stephen King novel.

2000–present: later films and voice work

Hussey played the lead in Mother Teresa of Calcutta (2003), a biographical film about Mother Teresa, for which she was presented with a Character & Morality in Entertainment Award on 12 May 2007 in Hollywood. She stated in an interview that it had been her dream and wish to portray the role of Mother Teresa of Calcutta since she finished her role as the Virgin Mary in Jesus of Nazareth. Hussey and Leonard Whiting reunited as on-screen partners in the film Social Suicide (2015), the only film that they both appeared in since Romeo and Juliet (1968). In the project, Hussey's daughter, actress India Eisley, played their fictional daughter, Julia Coulson.

Hussey has also worked as a voice actress, and was nominated for "Outstanding Individual Achievement for Voice Acting by a Female Performer in an Animated Television Production" at the Annie Awards for her work in the DC animated universe, as Talia, daughter of Ra's al Ghul. She voiced the character of Kasan Moor in the PC/Nintendo 64 game, Star Wars: Rogue Squadron (1998) and was also in the massively multiplayer online role-playing game Star Wars: The Old Republic (2011) as Jedi Master Yuon Par. She also lent her voice to Star Wars: Force Commander in 2000.

Legal issues
On 3 January 2023, Variety first reported that on 30 December, Hussey and Leonard Whiting filed a $500 million lawsuit against Paramount Pictures for sexual exploitation, sexual harassment, and fraud, regarding the nude scene in the 1968 film Romeo and Juliet, which was filmed when Hussey was 15 and Whiting was 16. In their court filing, the two actors stated that they had suffered emotional damage and mental anguish for decades. The complainants stated that director Franco Zeffirelli, who died in 2019, initially told the two that they would wear flesh-coloured undergarments in the bedroom scene, but that on the morning of the shoot, Zeffirelli told them that they would wear only body makeup, while assuring them the camera would be positioned in a way that would not show nudity, but that Whiting's bare buttocks and Hussey’s bare breasts are nonetheless briefly shown during the scene, in violation of California state and federal laws against indecency and the exploitation of children.

Personal life
Hussey has agoraphobia, which was aggravated by the fame she achieved after Romeo and Juliet. She briefly dated Leonard Whiting during 1968. They have remained friends ever since, reportedly communicating "at least once every 10 days."

When she was 18 years old, actress Hussey was allegedly raped by Christopher Jones in the house Roman Polanski had shared with his wife Sharon Tate, weeks after Tate's death. When she became pregnant, she had an abortion. Hussey had dated Jones in 1968 but ended the relationship because, she says, he was physically abusive toward her.

In 1971, she married Dean Paul Martin, the son of Dean Martin, on her twentieth birthday. They had one son, writer and actor Alexander Gunther Martin (born 1973). They divorced in 1978 but remained friends. Her ex-husband died in 1987, when the National Guard F-4 Phantom jet fighter he was piloting unaccountably crashed into the snow capped San Bernardino Mountains in California.

From 1980 until their 1989 divorce, Hussey was married to Japanese singer Akira Fuse. They had one son, Maximillian Hussey Fuse (born 1983). 

In 1991, she married American musician David Glen Eisley, the son of actor Anthony Eisley. They have one daughter, actress India Eisley (born 1993).

Hussey was diagnosed with breast cancer in 2008, and underwent a double mastectomy to treat the cancer. After being in remission for nearly a decade, Hussey learned in 2018 that the breast cancer had returned when a small tumour was discovered growing between her heart and lungs. She opted to undergo radiation and chemotherapy to treat the tumour, stating: "I'd refused chemotherapy and radiation treatment 10 years ago, wanting to avoid those poisons, but last year I had no choice, and they saved my life. The tumour shrank, I'm hoping to the size of a pea, and I'm doing well now. I'm healthy and happy."

Hussey's memoir, The Girl on the Balcony: Olivia Hussey Finds Life After Romeo and Juliet, was published on 31 July 2018.

Filmography

Film

Television

Video games

Stage credits

References

Sources

External links 

 
 
 
 Olivia Hussey at the British Film Institute

1951 births
20th-century English actresses
21st-century English actresses
21st-century English memoirists
21st-century English women writers
Actresses from Buenos Aires
Actresses from London
Argentine emigrants to England
Alumni of the Italia Conti Academy of Theatre Arts
British women memoirists
David di Donatello winners
English film actresses
English Roman Catholics
English Shakespearean actresses
English television actresses
English video game actresses
English voice actresses
Living people
New Star of the Year (Actress) Golden Globe winners